"Bachan" is a former spelling of Bacan, the largest of the Bacan Islands in Indonesia.

Bachan may also refer to:

 Bachan (surname), an alternate spelling of "Bachchan", an Indian surname
 Bachan, a village in Iran
 Bachan (rhetorician) or Pachan, an Italo-Briton mentioned in the life of Saint Cadoc and sometimes thought to have been the inspiration for Saint Fagan

See also
 Bachchan